A - B - C - D - E - F - G - H - I - J - K - L - M - N - O - P - Q - R - S - T - U - V - W - XYZ

This is a list of rivers in the United States that have names starting with the letter U.  For the main page, which includes links to listings by state, see List of rivers in the United States.

U 
Ugashik River - Alaska
Umatilla River - Oregon
Umpachene River - Massachusetts
Umpqua River - Oregon
Unadilla River - New York
Unalakleet River - Alaska
Uncompahgre River - Colorado
Union River - Maine
Unuk River - Alaska
Upper Ammonoosuc River - New Hampshire
Upper Iowa River - Minnesota, Iowa
Upper Tamarack River - Wisconsin, Minnesota
Us-kab-wan-ka River - Minnesota
Usquepaug River - Rhode Island
Utukok River - Alaska
Uwharrie River - North Carolina

U